Lussenhop or Lüssenhop is a German surname. Notable people with the surname include:

 Doug Lussenhop (born 1973), American musician, video editor, and comedian
 Jessica Lussenhop, American investigative journalist
 Wyn Hoop (Winfried Lüssenhop, born 1936), German singer

German-language surnames